Kato Pyrgos is a village in Cyprus. Kato Pyrgos is the only Greek Cypriot village located on Morphou Bay and controlled by the Republic of Cyprus. Due to its location, being surrounded by the Troodos Mountains, the Turkish controlled exclave of Kokkina, and the Green Line, it is rather isolated and difficult to reach, and gets significant numbers of visitors only in August during summer vacation.

A Green Line crossing point was opened near Kato Pyrgos on 18 October 2010 to facilitate travel from there to Nicosia.

Notable Places 

 Church Panagia Galoktistis

References

External links
Awarded "EDEN - European Destinations of Excellence" non traditional tourist destination 2010

Communities in Nicosia District